The Americas Zone was one of the three zones of the regional Davis Cup competition in 1996.

In the Americas Zone there were three different tiers, called groups, in which teams competed against each other to advance to the upper tier. Winners in Group I advanced to the World Group Qualifying Round, along with losing teams from the World Group first round. Teams who lost their respective ties competed in the relegation play-offs, with winning teams remaining in Group I, whereas teams who lost their play-offs were relegated to the Americas Zone Group II in 1997.

Participating nations

Draw

 relegated to Group II in 1997.
 and  advance to World Group Qualifying Round.

First round

Bahamas vs. Peru

Chile vs. Brazil

Venezuela vs. Canada

Second round

Argentina vs. Bahamas

Brazil vs. Venezuela

First round relegation play-offs

Canada vs. Chile

Second round relegation play-offs

Chile vs. Peru

References

External links
Davis Cup official website

Davis Cup Americas Zone
Americas Zone Group I